Perret is a former commune in the Côtes-d'Armor department of Brittany which lies in northwestern France. On 1 January 2017, it was merged into the new commune Bon Repos sur Blavet.

Population

See also
Communes of the Côtes-d'Armor department

References

External links

Former communes of Côtes-d'Armor